Intercuneiform ligaments may refer to:

 Dorsal intercuneiform ligaments
 Interosseous intercuneiform ligaments
 Plantar intercuneiform ligaments